Threonic acid is a sugar acid derived from threose. The -isomer is a metabolite of ascorbic acid (vitamin C). One study suggested that because -threonate inhibits DKK1 expression in vitro, it may have potential in treatment of androgenic alopecia.

References

Sugar acids
Alpha hydroxy acids
Triols